{{DISPLAYTITLE:C16H16N2O2}}
The molecular formula C16H16N2O2 (molar mass: 268.31 g/mol) may refer to:

 DMeOB
 Lysergic acid, or D-lysergic acid
 Salen ligand

Molecular formulas